Club Bàsquet Tarragona, more commonly referred to today by its sponsorship name of Tarragona Bàsquet 2017, is a professional Basketball team based in Tarragona, Catalonia who currently plays in LEB Plata.

Season by season

Retired numbers
5 Berni Álvarez, SF, 1992–95, 2004–07, 2008–10

Trophies and awards

Trophies
Copa LEB Plata: (1)
2001

Current roster

References

External links
Official website

Catalan basketball teams
Sport in Tarragona
Basketball teams established in 1978
Former LEB Oro teams
Liga EBA teams
Former LEB Plata teams